Elizabeth of Serbia (/Jelisaveta;  1270 — died 1331) was Baness of Bosnia by her marriage to Stephen I, Ban of Bosnia. Elizabeth briefly ruled as regent for her eldest son, Stephen II, in 1314.

Family
Elizabeth was the daughter of King Stephen Dragutin of Serbia of the Nemanjić dynasty. Her mother was Catherine of Hungary. Elizabeth was the second of four children; her brother was Stephen Vladislav II of Syrmia.

Life
After 1283, she married Stephen I Kotroman, Ban of Bosnia. Dragutin had already controlled two banates in Bosnia: Usora and Soli and Kotroman immediately fell under his influence – many of his acts were of Dragutin's command. The marriage was political and arranged by Ban Prijezda II who had attempted to forge an alliance with Stephen Dragutin (Elizabeth's father).

Elizabeth and Stephen had at least six children, all of whom are believed to have lived to adulthood:
 Stephen II (born 1292), Ban of Bosnia, whose daughter was Elizabeth, Queen of Hungary and Poland
 Vladislav (1295–1354), co-regent, whose son was Tvrtko I, the first King of Bosnia
 Ninoslav (born c. 1288 in Jajce), whose daughter was Mary, Countess of Helfenstein
 Miroslav
 Katarina (Catherine, born c. 1294 in Bribir–1355), who married Nikola of Hum before 1338, with issues Vladislav and Bogiša
 Marija (Mary, born c. 1308), who married Ludovik
possibly, a son (born c. 1300–died c. 1331)

Regency
After her husband's death in 1314, Elizabeth briefly ruled as regent for her eldest son, Stephen II. According to a 1601 source whose reliability is unknown, Elizabeth fled to the Republic of Ragusa (Dubrovnik). and died around 1331. Upon extinction of the Nemanjić dynasty, Elizabeth's grandson Tvrtko, Ban of Bosnia, had himself crowned King of Bosnia and King of Serbia based on his descent from Elizabeth.

References

Sources

External links

|-

Medieval Serbian princesses
1270 births
1331 deaths
14th-century Serbian royalty
Nemanjić dynasty
Kotromanić dynasty
Women of medieval Bosnia and Herzegovina
13th-century Serbian women
14th-century women rulers
Daughters of kings